The Namibia Women's Super League also named NFA Skorpion Zinc Women's Super League is a semi-professional level women's association football league in Namibia. It is organized by the Namibia Football Association.

History 
In 2005 women's football was only played informally with very few teams. In November 2006 FIFA granted Namibia the right to host the Football Seminar for South & East Africa Countries to discuss, elaborate and share best practices and establish a plan of action to develop the women's game. A national championship was then contested, consisting of regional leagues and playoffs for the championship. From 2009 to 2011 there was no competition.

In 2011 the Women's Super League was created with six teams. FIFA help starting the league by sponsoring 100,000 Namibian dollars and football attires and training equipment for the teams. The first season was won by Jacqueline Shipanga (JS) Academy.

In 2014 a U20 Super League was created.

Champions 
The list of champions and runners-up. Okahandja Beauties won at least four championships before creation of the super league. The 2014 season was suspended because funds needed were used for hosting the 2014 African Women's Championship. The second season then was 2015/16.

Most successful clubs

References

External links 
 Namibia Football Federation website

Women's association football leagues in Africa
Football leagues in Namibia
2005 establishments in Namibia
Sports leagues established in 2005
Women's football in Namibia
Women's sports leagues in Namibia